The Zhi Xian Party, also known as the Chinese Constitutionalist Party in English, is an unregistered political party in China. It was founded in 2013 by people who support the Chinese Communist Party's position as the country's ruling party, but who also seek a return to a Maoist model and an end to what they consider violations of the national constitution by the Communist Party. Bo Xilai was elected the party's "Chairman for Life", because of his support for the Chinese New Left's policies, and because the party considered the trial against him unjust. The party was banned in December 2013.

Notes

References 

2013 establishments in China
Banned political parties in China
Banned communist parties
Communist parties in China
History of the Chinese Communist Party
Chinese New Left
Political parties established in 2013